Shree Kshetra Audumbar is in Palus Taluka, it is about only 12km from Palus city, 15km from Kirloskarvadi and 8 Kilometers east from Bhilawadi Railway station, audumbar is known for the shrine of Shree Dattatraya held in high reverence. It is said to have been built in honor of Shree Narasimha Saraswati who is supposed to be the second incarnation of Shree Dattatraya.

Nearby Places to visit
 Palus
 Grapes farm in surrounding 
 Goddess Bhuvaneshwari Temple
 Brahmanand Swami Math
 Sangameshwar Shiva Temple, Haripur
 Sangli
 Narsobawadi
 Kopeshwar Temple Khidrapur
 Krishna ghat, Bhilawadi 
 Chitale Milk unit, Bhilawadi
 Sangli Ganpati temple
  Sagareshwar wildlife sanctuary
 Yashwantrao Chavan Sagareshwar Wildlife Sanctuary
 Jyotiba at Wadi Ratnagiri
 Shree Brahmanand Swami Math

Railway Station

 Kirloskarvadi and Bhilawadi railway station is very nearest railway stations to audumbar. We also get rickshaw and cars on rent from Palus taluka.

 Sangli railway station which is 26 km from Audumbar.Auto rickshaw and private cars are available from Sangli railway station to Audumbar.

Bus Station
 Palus Bus station is only 12 km from audumbar.

 Sangli Bus Station which is 25 km from Audumbar city buses also available to audumbar.

Accommodation
You can stay at various 3 start hotels and budget hotels and lodges available in Sangli city And also in Palus
There is a hospice near the temple wherein you can stay.

References

Tourist attractions in Maharashtra
Sangli district